Simone Vitale (born 1 March 1986) is an Italian footballer who plays as a defender.

Biography
Born in Balsorano, Abruzzo, Vitale started his career at Abruzzo team Pescara. Vitale was an unused member in 2003 UEFA European Under-17 Football Championship. Vitale made his Serie B debut on 11 September 2004, against Piacenza. On 31 August 2005 he left for Pro Vasto in temporary deal. In summer 2006 the temporary deal was renewed. The club also signed several players from Pescara such as Vincenzo Aridità on 25 August and Alessandro Rapino on 30 August 2006. Pescara was relegated in 2007. Vitale spent 3 seasons with the club in Serie C1 (later renamed to Lega Pro Prima Divisione), winning the promotion back to Serie B as the play-off winner of 2009–10 Lega Pro Prima Divisione. Vitale played once in 2010–11 Serie B.

On 25 July 2011 Vitale left for Frosinone in co-ownership deal for €100,000 in 3-year contract and Mario Artistico in definitive deal for €130,000 in 2-year deal, as part of Antonio Bocchetti's deal, for €170,000. The deals made Frosinone paid Pescara €60,000 cash only. In June 2012 Frosinone acquired Vitale outright for free.

On 2 September 2013 he was signed by Nocerina.

On 31 January 2019 he was released from his contract with Teramo by mutual consent.

References

External links
 Lega Serie B profile 

1986 births
Sportspeople from the Province of L'Aquila
Footballers from Abruzzo
Living people
Italian footballers
Delfino Pescara 1936 players
Vastese Calcio 1902 players
Frosinone Calcio players
A.S.G. Nocerina players
S.S. Chieti Calcio players
S.S. Teramo Calcio players
Serie B players
Serie C players
Serie D players
Association football defenders